Idrija (in older sources Zgornja Idrija;) is a town in western Slovenia. It is the seat of the Municipality of Idrija. It is located in the traditional region of Inner Carniola and is in the Gorizia Statistical Region. It is notable for its mercury mine with stores and infrastructure, as well as miners' living quarters, and a miners' theatre. Together with the Spanish mine at Almadén, it has been a UNESCO World Heritage Site since 2012. In 2011, Idrija was given the Alpine Town of the Year award.

Geography

The town of Idrija lies in the Idrija Basin, surrounded by the Idrija Hills. It is traversed by the Idrijca River, which is joined there by Nikova Creek. It includes the hamlets of Brusovše, Cegovnica, Prenjuta, and Žabja Vas close to the town center, as well as the more outlying hamlets of Češnjice, Ljubevč, Kovačev Rovt, Marof, Mokraška Vas, Podroteja, Razpotje, Staje, and Zahoda. The Marof hydroelectric plant is located on the Idrijca River on the northern outskirts of Idrija, between Marof and Mokraška Vas. Springs in the area include Podroteja Spring and Wild Lake on the Idrijca River south of the town.

History

Mercury was discovered in Idrija (known as Idria under Austrian rule) in the late 15th century (various sources cite 1490, 1492, and 1497). To support the mining activities, Gewerkenegg Castle was constructed between 1522 and 1533 by the mine owners. Mining operations were taken over by the government in 1580. The mineral idrialite, discovered here in 1832, is named after the town.

Legend
According to legend, a bucket maker working in a local spring spotted a small amount of liquid mercury over 500 years ago. Idrija is one of the few places in the world where mercury occurs in both its elemental liquid state and as cinnabar (mercury sulfide) ore. The subterranean shaft mine entrance known as Anthony's Shaft (Antonijev rov) is used today for tours of the upper levels, complete with life-sized depictions of workers over the ages. The lower levels, which extend to almost 400 meters below the surface and are no longer being actively mined, are currently being cleaned up.

Church
The parish church in the town is dedicated to Saint Joseph the Worker and belongs to the Diocese of Koper. There are three other churches in Idrija, dedicated to the Holy Trinity, Saint Anthony of Padua, and Our Lady of Sorrows.

Notable people
Notable people that were born or lived in Idrija include:
Aleš Bebler (1907–1981), Slovene Communist leader, resistance fighter, and diplomat
Jožef Blasnik (1800–1872), printer, publisher
Stanko Bloudek (1890–1959), designer
Borut Božič (born 1980), professional road cyclist
Aleš Čar (born 1971), writer
Karel Dežman (1821–1889), Carniolan politician and scholar
Damir Feigel (1879–1959), writer, journalist, cultural worker, satirist, humorist, father of Slovenian science fiction, national awakener and anti-fascism fighter
Heinrich Freyer (1802–1866), Slovenian botanist, cartographer, pharmacist and natural scientist
Ludvik Grilc (1851–1910), painter/portrait painter
Belsazar Hacquet (1739/40–1815), French natural scientist
Marko Hatlak (born 1980), accordionist
Vladimír Karfík (1901–1996), Czechoslovak architect
Eva Lucija Cecilija Viktorija Emilija Kraus, (1785–1845), Baroness of Wolsberg, lover of French Emperor Napoleon
Marko V. Lipold (1816–1883), Miner, geologist and lawyer, known as the father of Slovenian geology
Jožef Mrak (1709–1786), one of the most notable Slovenian polytechnicians
Pier Paolo Pasolini (1922–1975), Italian film director and poet
Vasja Pirc (1907–1980), chess grandmaster
Nikolaj Pirnat (1903–1948), sculptor, painter, illustrator and author
Zorko Prelovec (1887–1939), musician, composer, choir composition author
Luka Rupnik (born 1993), Slovenian basketball player
Marko Ivan Rupnik (born 1954), artist, philosopher and theologian
Giovanni Antonio Scopoli (1723–1788), Italian natural scientist
Jan Tratnik (born 1990), professional road cyclist
Anton Aloys Wolf (1782–1859), Roman Catholic bishop, philanthropist, patron of literature

See also
 The ghost town of New Idria, California, a site of mercury mining during the 19th-century California Gold Rush, was named after Idrija.

References

Sources

External links 

 Idrija on Geopedia
 Idrija municipal museum
 Local newspaper
 Tourist info
 Tourist information, a page in English about the town and its history
 Town portal

 
Populated places in the Municipality of Idrija
Mining communities in Slovenia
Cities and towns in the Slovene Littoral
World Heritage Sites in Slovenia
Mercury mining